Attorney General Chamberlain may refer to:

Daniel Henry Chamberlain (1835–1907), Attorney General of South Carolina
George Earle Chamberlain (1854–1928), Attorney General of Oregon

See also
General Chamberlain (disambiguation)